Junix elumbis is a species of damselfly in the family Coenagrionidae. It is endemic to Venezuela. It occupies moist, lowland habitats that are subtropical or tropical, usually near forests or rivers.

References

Endemic fauna of Venezuela
Invertebrates of Venezuela
Coenagrionidae
Odonata of South America
Insects described in 1968
Taxonomy articles created by Polbot